"Again" is Japanese pop rock singer-songwriter Yui's thirteenth single, and first single after she went on hiatus in November 2008. "Again" was released on June 3, 2009, by her label Studioseven Recordings and was released in two formats: CD and CD+DVD.

The single debuted atop the Oricon Weekly Single Chart becoming her fourth number-one single. The single has the highest opening week sales for a female act in 2009, which was previously held by Pop singer Ayumi Hamasaki's "Rule/Sparkle" for selling 95,000 copies in its first week.

Background
On March 25, 2009, YUI announced on her official website that she was ending her hiatus and returning to the music scene. On her website she also announced that she had worked on a new single, "Again". It was later revealed that "Again" was going to be used as the first opening theme song for the Fullmetal Alchemist: Brotherhood anime series.

Track list
Normal Edition

Limited Edition
Normal Edition + DVD

Charts and certifications

Charts

Sales and certifications

References

2009 songs
2009 singles
Yui (singer) songs
Fullmetal Alchemist songs
Billboard Japan Hot 100 number-one singles
Oricon Weekly number-one singles
Songs written by Yui (singer)